Manson–Northwest Webster Community School District (MNW) is a rural public school district headquartered in Manson, Iowa. It operates an elementary school and a junior–senior high school; the former is in Barnum and the latter is in Manson.  the schools respectively had 477 and 343 students.

It occupies sections of Webster, Calhoun, and Pocahontas counties. The district serves Manson, Barnum, Clare, and Knierim.

, the district had about 820 students, with 477 in primary school and 343 in secondary school.

History

It was established on July 1, 1993, with the merger of the Manson and Northwest Webster districts.

The district planned for a school bond election on September 8, 2018, for $8.8 million.

Schools
The district operates two schools:
 Manson–Northwest Webster Elementary School, Barnum
 Manson–Northwest Webster High School, Manson

Manson–Northwest Webster High School

Athletics
The Cougars compete in the Twin Lakes Conference in the following sports:

Cross country
Volleyball
Football
Basketball
Wrestling
Track and field
 Boys' 2-time class 1A state champions (2012, 2013)
Golf 
Baseball 
Softball

See also
List of school districts in Iowa
List of high schools in Iowa

References

External links
 Manson–Northwest Webster Community School District

School districts in Iowa
1993 establishments in Iowa
School districts established in 1993
Education in Calhoun County, Iowa
Education in Pocahontas County, Iowa
Education in Webster County, Iowa